Ivan Kolev may refer to:

Ivan Kolev (footballer, born 1930) (1930–2005), Bulgarian footballer, 1956 Olympics bronze medalist
Ivan Kolev (footballer, born 1995), Bulgarian footballer
Ivan Kolev (football manager) (born 1957), Bulgarian football manager
Ivan Kolev (wrestler) (born 1951), Bulgarian wrestler, 1976 Olympics bronze medalist
Ivan Kolev (general) (1863–1917), Bulgarian general during WWI